John Baker Muir (born 18 November 1903) was a Scottish footballer who played for several clubs including Queen of the South, Dumbarton, Falkirk, Bristol Rovers and Arbroath.

References

1903 births
Scottish footballers
Dumbarton F.C. players
Falkirk F.C. players
Queen of the South F.C. players
Arbroath F.C. players
Bristol Rovers F.C. players
Scottish Football League players
English Football League players
Year of death missing
Association football central defenders